Hallowell is an unincorporated community in Cherokee County, Kansas, United States.  As of the 2020 census, the population of the community and nearby areas was 101.

History
Hallowell was a station on the St. Louis–San Francisco Railway.

Demographics

For statistical purposes, the United States Census Bureau has defined Hallowell as a census-designated place (CDP).

See also
 Big Brutus

References

Further reading

External links
 USD 493, local school district
 Cherokee County maps: Current, Historic, KDOT

Unincorporated communities in Cherokee County, Kansas
Unincorporated communities in Kansas